Shada Mustafa (شذى مصطفى) is a Palestinian novelist, best known for her novel ما تركت خلفي (English:Things I Left Behind) which was shortlisted for the Sheikh Zayed Book Award for Literature 2021, Young Author category.

Early life and education 
Mustafa was born in Palestine, studied architecture in Lebanon at the American University of Beirut before moving to Germany. She also has a master's degree in Human Geography from the Free University of Berlin. She took part in the Lund School of Architecture Spring Exhibition of 2017.

Career  
Her first novel ما تركت خلفي (English: Things I Left Behind) was published by Hachette Antoine in Arabic and by Banipal in English, in 2020. The book is fictional, although she described it as a fictional autobiography, and is about two Palestinian sisters with divorced parents. One sister falls in love with a man in Sweden. The book it set in 2000, and includes themes of Israeli occupation, family dynamics, and women's liberation. The book was translated into English by Nancy Roberts.

Selected publications 

 Shada Mustafa, ما تركت خلفي (English: Things I Left Behind), 2022, published by Hachette Antoine and Banipal
 Lama Altakruri, Shayma Nader, Adele Jarrar, Shada Mustafa, Qusai Al Saify, Hiba Isleem, Jamila Ewais, and Fakhry Al-Serdawi, Reworlding Ramallah: A collection of Palestinian Science-Fiction Short Stories, Onomatopee (Germany) & Dar Laila Publishing (Palestine), 2019

References

External links 

 What I Left Behind, publishers official website (Arabic)
 What I Left Behind, publishers official website (English)
 Author interview with The Independent (Arabic)

21st-century Palestinian women writers
American University of Beirut alumni
Palestinian expatriates in Germany
Arab writers
1995 births
Living people
Free University of Berlin alumni